A' Chailleach may refer to the following mountains in Scotland:

A' Chailleach (Fannichs)
A' Chailleach (Monadhliath Mountains)